San Manuel (formerly Callang), officially the Municipality of San Manuel, is a 4th class municipality in the province of Isabela, Philippines. According to the 2020 census, it has a population of 34,085 people.

The major industry in San Manuel is farming.

History
In 1957, the barrios of Callang, Eden, Babanuang, Cabaritan, Santa Cruz, Malalinta, Mararigue, Calaocan, and Caraniogan of Roxas were separated to form Callang. In 1965 the town was renamed as San Manuel.

Geography

Barangays
San Manuel is politically subdivided into 19 barangays. These barangays are headed by elected officials: Barangay Captain, Barangay Council, whose members are called Barangay Councilors. All are elected every three years.

 Agliam
 Babanuang
 Cabaritan
 Caraniogan
 Eden
 Malalinta
 Mararigue
 Nueva Era
 Pisang
 District 1 (Poblacion)
 District 2 (Poblacion)
 District 3 (Poblacion)
 District 4 (Poblacion)
 San Francisco
 Sandiat Centro
 Sandiat East
 Sandiat West
 Santa Cruz
 Villanueva

Climate

Demographics

Economy

Government

Local government
The municipality is governed by a mayor designated as its local chief executive and by a municipal council as its legislative body in accordance with the Local Government Code. The mayor, vice mayor, and the councilors are elected directly by the people through an election which is being held every three years.

Elected officials

Congress representation
San Manuel, belonging to the fifth legislative district of the province of Isabela, currently represented by Hon. Faustino Michael Carlos T. Dy III.

Education
The Schools Division of Isabela governs the town's public education system. The division office is a field office of the DepEd in Cagayan Valley region. The office governs the public and private elementary and public and private high schools throughout the municipality.

See also
List of renamed cities and municipalities in the Philippines

References

External links
  Municipal Profile at the National Competitiveness Council of the Philippines
 San Manuel at the Isabela Government Website
 Local Governance Performance Management System
 [ Philippine Standard Geographic Code]
 Philippine Census Information
 Municipality of San Manuel

Municipalities of Isabela (province)